Richard Dean Parsons (born April 4, 1948), an American business executive, is the former chairman of Citigroup and the former chairman and CEO of Time Warner. He stepped down as CEO of Time Warner on December 31, 2007. He was previously the interim CEO of the Los Angeles Clippers NBA franchise. In September 2018, Parsons became the Interim Chairman of the Board for CBS replacing Les Moonves. On October 21, 2018, he resigned for health reasons from CBS and was replaced by Strauss Zelnick.

Early life 
Parsons was born to an African-American family in Brooklyn, New York City, on April 4, 1948. He was one of five children. His maternal grandfather had been head groundskeeper at the John D. Rockefeler estate, Kykuit. Growing up in the Bedford-Stuyvesant area of Brooklyn, Parsons's father, Lorenzo Locklair Parsons, was an electrical technician and his mother, Isabelle (née Judd) was a homemaker. He skipped a grade in elementary school and another in high school. He later attended the University of Hawaii at Manoa, where at 6'4" tall he may have played varsity basketball. After four years, he was seven credits short of his diploma. However, he discovered that he could get into a law school in New York without a college degree if he scored well enough on his pre-law exams. Parsons was accepted by Albany Law School of Union University, New York, where he earned a Juris Doctor in 1971, finishing at the top of his class.

Career 
In 1971, Parsons served an internship at the New York State Legislature, at which time he was invited to work as a lawyer for the staff of New York Governor Nelson Rockefeller. When Rockefeller was appointed Vice President of the United States, in 1974, Parsons followed him to Washington D.C., where he worked directly with President Gerald Ford. He also met a deputy attorney general, Harold R. Tyler, and one of his aides, a young Rudolph W. Giuliani, with whom he was to be closely associated – supporting him in his campaign for New York mayor and heading his transitional council.

In 1977, Parsons returned to New York and became a partner after only two years at the Patterson Belknap Webb & Tyler law firm; also working at the firm was Giuliani. During his 11 years at the firm Parsons took on Happy Rockefeller, the widow of Nelson (who had died in 1979) as a high-profile client. In 1988, he was recruited to serve as chief operating officer of the Dime Savings Bank of New York by CEO Harry W. Albright Jr., who was a former Rockefeller aide. Parsons later became chairman and CEO and oversaw a merger with Anchor Savings Bank, gaining a substantial sum when the Dime Bank was demutualized.

Three years later, in 1991, on the recommendation of Nelson's brother Laurance Rockefeller to the then CEO Steve Ross, Parsons was invited to join Time Warner's board; he subsequently became president of the company in 1995, recruited by chief executive Gerald Levin. He helped negotiate the company's merger with America Online in 2000, creating a $165-billion media conglomerate that is "usually described as the worst merger of all time." In December 2001, it was announced that Levin would retire and Parsons had been selected as his successor. The announcement surprised many media watchers who expected chief operating officer Robert Pittman to take the helm. In 2003, Parsons made the announcement of the name change from AOL Time Warner to simply Time Warner.

Parsons was chairman of Citigroup from February 23, 2009 until April 2012 when he was replaced by Michael O'Neill. He is chairman of the advisory board of Feigen Advisors, a CEO advisory firm run by Marc Feigen.

In September 2018, Parsons became the Interim Chairman of the Board for CBS, replacing Les Moonves. In October 2018 Parsons stepped down from the position, citing difficulties brought about by his battle with Multiple myeloma. He was replaced by Strauss Zelnick.

Humanitarian causes 
In 2007, Parsons became the chairman of the board of directors of the Jazz Foundation of America. He is also Chair of the Apollo Theater Foundation and co-chair of the advisory board of the Smithsonian National Museum of African American History and Culture.

In June 2016, Parsons was appointed Board Chair of The Rockefeller Foundation, a foundation promoting the wellbeing of humanity all over the world. He joined the foundation's board of trustees in 2008.

Prominent connections 
From the early 1980s through much of the 1990s, Parsons owned a house near the Rockefeller family estate in Pocantico Hills (see Kykuit), where his grandfather was once a groundskeeper. For a brief time he worked for Nelson Rockefeller at the family office, "Room 5600", at Rockefeller Center.

Parsons became chairman emeritus of the Partnership for New York City, established by David Rockefeller in 1979, who has known him for many years. He became an advisory trustee of the family's principal philanthropy, the Rockefeller Brothers Fund, and he sits with David Rockefeller on the board of the World Trade Center Memorial Foundation. Parsons is also on the board of the family-created Museum of Modern Art.

In 2001, United States President George W. Bush selected Parsons to co-chair a commission on Social Security. Parsons also worked on the transition team for Michael Bloomberg, who was elected Mayor of New York City in 2001. In 2006, Parsons was selected to co-chair the transition team for the incoming Governor of New York, Eliot Spitzer.

In August 2006, an article in New York Magazine reported that Parsons would likely run for Mayor of New York City in the 2009 New York mayoral election. Parsons, however, repeatedly denied the reports, supported Mayor Bloomberg's efforts to repeal the term limits law, and supported Bloomberg for a third term in office.

Parsons was a member of the economic advisory team for President Barack Obama. He met with the then President-elect on Friday, November 7, 2008, along with many other economic experts, to discuss measures to solve the current economic crisis. After New Mexico Governor Bill Richardson withdrew his name from consideration for the position of Secretary of Commerce in the Obama Administration, Parsons's name was floated as a possible nominee.

On May 9, 2014, in the wake of the Donald Sterling racial remarks controversy, it was announced that Richard Parsons was appointed the interim CEO of the Los Angeles Clippers.

Personal life 
In 1968, Parsons married Laura Ann Bush, a community activist with a doctorate in child psychology, who he met at the University of Hawaii. They have three grown children.

In 2009, he had a child with model-philanthropist MacDella Cooper as a result of an extra-marital affair. Being of Liberian ethnicity, Cooper founded the MacDella Cooper Foundation in 2004 to help orphans and abandoned children in Liberia following the Second Liberian Civil War.

In 2015, Parsons was diagnosed with multiple myeloma, a rare form of blood cancer. Though he went into remission after Stem-cell therapy, complications in 2018 caused him to step down from his role as Interim Chairman of the Board of CBS.

References

External links 
 Richard D. Parsons, biography at the Time Warner corporate website
 Richard Parsons biography at the Encyclopedia of World Biography

|-

1948 births
African-American business executives
African-American investors
African-American lawyers
Albany Law School alumni
American business executives
American chief executives in the media industry
American investors
American men's basketball players
Basketball players from New York City
Businesspeople from New York City
Citigroup people
Hawaii Rainbow Warriors basketball players
Living people
Los Angeles Clippers executives
Patterson Belknap Webb & Tyler people
People from Bedford–Stuyvesant, Brooklyn
People with multiple myeloma
Sportspeople from Brooklyn
University of Hawaiʻi at Mānoa alumni
Warner Bros. Discovery people
21st-century African-American people
20th-century African-American people